Ronald Sing Wai Lew (Chinese name: 刘成威; born September 19, 1941) is a senior United States district judge of the United States District Court for the Central District of California.

Education and career

Born in Los Angeles, California, Lew graduated from Loyola High School. He received a Bachelor of Arts degree from Loyola Marymount University in 1964. He received a Juris Doctor from Southwestern University School of Law in 1971. He was in the United States Army from 1967 to 1969. He was a deputy city attorney of the Criminal and Civil Liability Divisions of the Los Angeles City Attorney's Office in California from 1972 to 1974. He was in private practice of law in Los Angeles from 1974 to 1981. He was a Los Angeles fire and police pension commissioner from 1976 to 1982. He was a judge on the Los Angeles Municipal Court from 1982 to 1984. He was a judge on the Los Angeles Superior Court from 1984 to 1987.

Federal judicial service

Lew was nominated by President Ronald Reagan on February 2, 1987, to a seat on the United States District Court for the Central District of California vacated by Judge Laughlin E. Waters. He was confirmed by the United States Senate on May 7, 1987, and received commission the same day. He assumed senior status on September 19, 2006. Outside of Hawaii, Lew was the first Chinese-American appointed to the federal bench after being appointed by President Reagan in 1987.

Awards and honors

In 2001, Lew was awarded the Historymakers Award by the Los Angeles Chinese American Museum in law and justice. He was also honored by the Chinese Historical Society of Southern California (CHSSC) as one of the Chinese American Pioneers in Law in 2005.

See also
List of Asian American jurists
List of first minority male lawyers and judges in the United States

References

Sources
 

1941 births
Living people
Loyola Marymount University alumni
Southwestern Law School alumni
Lawyers from Los Angeles
Members of Committee of 100
California state court judges
Judges of the United States District Court for the Central District of California
United States district court judges appointed by Ronald Reagan
20th-century American judges
American jurists of Chinese descent
Superior court judges in the United States
21st-century American judges